Andalusia (Spanish: Andalucía) is an autonomous community of Spain.

Andalusia or Andalucía may also refer to:

Places

United States
 Andalusia, Alabama
 The Andalusia (Los Angeles, California), a historic apartment building in Hollywood
 Andalusia, Florida
 Andalusia (Milledgeville, Georgia), the home of Flannery O'Connor, listed on the National Register of Historic Places
 Andalusia, Illinois
 Andalusia, Pennsylvania
 Andalusia (estate), also known as the Nicholas Biddle Estate, Pennsylvania

Other places
 Al-Andalus, the Arabic name of the Iberian Peninsula, especially its southern part
 Four Kingdoms of Andalusia, the southern kingdoms of Castile which were conquered from the former Al-Andalus
 Andalucia (Jordan), a gated community near Amman
 Andalucía, Valle del Cauca, Colombia
 Point Andalusia, a location in the Southern Atlantic Ocean

Music
 Andalucia (album), a 2002 album by Tito & Tarantula
 "Andalucia" (John Cale song), a song on the 1973 album Paris 1919
 "Andalucia" (Doves song), a song on the 2010 compilation album The Places Between: The Best of Doves
 "Andalucía" or "The Breeze and I", the second part of Ernesto Lecuona's 1928 "Andalucía Suite"
 "Andalucia", a song by Crooked Fingers from the 2005 album Dignity and Shame
 "Andalucía", a song in spanish by French Latino on the 2010 album Guarda la esperanza, adaptation of the Serenade by Franz Schubert
 "Andalusia", a song by Shiner from the 2001 album The Egg
 "Andalusia", a song by Joe Satriani featured on the 2008 album Professor Satchafunkilus and the Musterion of Rock
 "Andalusia", a song by Hammock from the 2010 album Chasing After Shadows...Living with the Ghosts

Other
 Andalucia (Excavata), a genus of protozoans
 Andalucía (cycling team), a Spanish cycling team
 S.S. Andalusia, a fictional ship in Rocky and Bullwinkle's, Jet Fuel Formula

See also 
 
 Andalasia, a fictional setting in the 2007 film Enchanted
 Andalusian (disambiguation)
 Andalus (disambiguation)